Edward Bootle-Wilbraham, 1st Earl of Lathom  (12 December 1837 – 19 November 1898), known as The Lord Skelmersdale between 1853 and 1880, was a British Conservative politician. He was a member of every Conservative administration between 1866 and 1898, and notably served three times as Lord Chamberlain of the Household under Lord Salisbury. Having succeeded his grandfather as Baron Skelmersdale in 1853, he was created Earl of Lathom in 1880.

Early life

Bootle-Wilbraham was born at Blythe Hall, Lathom, Lancashire, the son of Hon. Richard Bootle-Wilbraham, MP, eldest son of Edward Bootle-Wilbraham, 1st Baron Skelmersdale. His mother was Jessy, daughter of Sir Richard Brooke, 6th Baronet of Norton. His father died when Edward was only 7 years old and he was brought up by his grandparents at nearby Lathom House.

He was educated at Eton and Christ Church, Oxford. Whilst a student at Oxford he was initiated into the Apollo University Lodge No 357, and became an active Freemason. He was appointed Honorary Colonel of the 11th (1st Preston) Lancashire Rifle Volunteer Corps on 9 November 1872.

Career
Bootle-Wilbraham succeeded his grandfather as second Baron Skelmersdale in 1853 and was entitled to take a seat in the House of Lords on his 21st birthday in 1858. He served under the Earl of Derby and then Benjamin Disraeli as a Lord-in-waiting from 1866 to 1868. In 1870 he became Conservative Chief Whip in the House of Lords. He once again held office under Disraeli as Captain of the Yeomen of the Guard from 1874 to 1880, and was admitted to the Privy Council in 1874.

In 1880 he was created Earl of Lathom, in the County Palatine of Lancaster. Lord Lathom later held office under Lord Salisbury as Lord Chamberlain of the Household from 1885 to 1886, from 1886 to 1892, and from 1895 to 1898. In 1892 he was appointed a Knight Grand Cross of the Order of the Bath.

Personal life
On 16 August 1860, Lord Lathom married Lady Alice Villiers, daughter of George Villiers, 4th Earl of Clarendon and the former Lady Katharine Barham (widow of John Joseph Barham, and eldest daughter of James Grimston, 1st Earl of Verulam). Together, they were the parents of:

 Constance Adela born 16 July 1862 Died 10 Nov 1864 Lathom House
 Edward George Bootle-Wilbraham, 2nd Earl of Lathom (1864–1910), married 1889 Lady Wilma Pleydell-Bouverie, daughter of William Pleydell-Bouverie, 5th Earl of Radnor.
 Hon. Villiers Richard Bootle-Wilbraham, born abt. 1867, married 1900 to Violet Inez de Romero.
 Randle Arthur Brooke Bootle-Wilbraham born 1868 Royal Navy Died 1899, Orme, France
 Hon. Reginald Francis Bootle-Wilbraham, born abt. 1875, married 1903 to Lilian Mary Holt, daughter of Major William Lyster Holt
 Lady Alice Maud Bootle-Wilbraham, O.B.E.
 Lady Bertha Mabel Bootle-Wilbraham, married 1903 to Maj. Arthur Frederick Dawkins, Great grandson of Sir Henry Clinton, and a great great grandson of Henry Dawkins the brother of James and also Charles Colyear, 2nd Earl of Portmore. They had one daughter, Edith.
 Lady Edith Cecil. Bootle-Wilbraham.bap Jan 1870. Died 1899.
 Lady Florence Mary Bootle-Wilbraham (d. 1944), married the Right Reverend Lord William Cecil, Bishop of Exeter, son of Robert Gascoyne-Cecil, 3rd Marquess of Salisbury, and had issue.

The Countess of Lathom died in a carriage accident in November 1897, aged 56. Lady Alice's Drive, opposite Blythe Hall, is named after her. Lord Lathom survived her by a year and died in November 1898, aged 60. He was succeeded in his titles by his eldest son, Edward, Lord Skelmersdale.

References

1837 births
1898 deaths
Earls in the Peerage of the United Kingdom
Knights Grand Cross of the Order of the Bath
Members of the Privy Council of the United Kingdom
People educated at Eton College
Alumni of Christ Church, Oxford
Presidents of the Marylebone Cricket Club
Freemasons of the United Grand Lodge of England
Peers of the United Kingdom created by Queen Victoria